Ruffneck may refer to:

 DJ Ruffneck, the most common alias of Patrick van Kerckhoven
 Ruffneck (band), a house music group from New Jersey
 "Ruffneck", a song by MC Lyte
 "Ruffneck", by the Freestylers
 "Ruffneck (Full Flex)", a song by Skrillex

Roughneck may refer to:
 Roughneck, slang for a labourer
 Rasczak's Roughnecks, a platoon in the novel Starship Troopers and its film adaptation